A jali or jaali (jālī, meaning "net") is the term for a perforated stone or latticed screen, usually with an ornamental pattern constructed through the use of calligraphy, geometry or natural patterns. This form of architectural decoration is common in Indo-Islamic architecture and more generally in Indian architecture. It is closely related to mashrabiya in Islamic architecture.

According to Yatin Pandya, the jali allows light and air while minimizing the sun and the rain, as well as providing cooling through passive ventilation.> The holes are often nearly of the same width or smaller than the thickness of the stone, thus providing structural strength. It has been observed that humid areas like Kerala and Konkan have larger holes with overall lower opacity than compared with the dry climate regions of Gujarat and Rajasthan.

With the widespread use of glass in the late 19th century, and  compactness of the residential areas in the modern India, jalis became less frequent for privacy and security matters. In the 21st century, it has gained popularity again as a low-energy building solution for the environmental footprint of energy use by buildings.

History 
Early jali work with multiple geometric shapes was built by carving into stone, in geometric patterns, first appearing in the Alai Darwaza of 1305 at Delhi besides the Qutub Minar, while later the Mughals used very finely carved plant-based designs, as at the Taj Mahal. They also often added pietra dura inlay to the surrounds, using marble and semi-precious stones.

In the Gwalior fort, near the Urwahi gate, there is a 17 line inscription dated Samvat 1553, mentioning names of some craftsmen and their creations. One of them is Khedu, who was an expert in "Gwaliyai jhilmili" i.e. jali screen crafted in the Gwalior style. The Mughal period tomb of Muhammad Ghaus built in  1565 AD at Gwalior is remarkable for its stone jalis. Many of the Gwalior's 19th century houses used stone jalis. Jalis are used extensively in Gwalior's Usha Kiran Palace Hotel, formerly Scindia's guest house.

Museum collections
Some of the jalis are in major museums in USA and Europe. These include  Indianapolis Museum of Art  and Metropolitan Museum of Art and Victoria and Albert Museum.

Illustrations

See also
 Girih
 Jharokha
 Openwork
 Venturi effect

References

Sources

External links

Architectural elements
Indian architectural styles
Islamic architectural elements
Islamic architecture
Mughal architecture elements
Passive ventilation
Passive cooling